Achim Benning (born 20 January 1935 in Magdeburg) is a German actor and director.

Benning finished his actor training in 1959 and was thereafter engaged at various German theatres. Starting in 1971, he began to work as a director, enabling him to become a director at the Viennese Burgtheater.

References

External links
 

1935 births
Living people
German male stage actors
German theatre directors
20th-century German male actors